Biphragmosagittidae is a family of worms belonging to the order Biphragmosagittiformes.

Genera:
 Biphragmofastigata Kassatkina, 2011
 Biphragmosagitta Kassatkina, 2011

References

Chaetognatha